Kelvin Morris (born October 25, 1982) is a former American football linebacker who is currently a free agent. He was signed by the Spokane Shock as a street free agent in 2007. He played college football at West Georgia.

Morris has also been a member of the Utah Blaze and Calgary Stampeders.

College career
Morris began his college career at Southwest Mississippi Community College, where he played football for two seasons.
Morris would sign a letter of intent to join the Clemson Tigers football team in 2002. He appeared as a reserve for the Tigers, and after tearing his anterior cruciate ligament and being declared academically ineligible, Morris transferred out of Clemson. Morris ended up playing his final college football season at the University of West Georgia, where he earned the Gulf South Conference Defensive Player of the Year in 2005.

Professional career

Arena Football League
Morris began his Arena Football League career with the Utah Blaze in 2008. That season, he recorded 51 tackles, 12 broken up passes, and two interceptions, returning one for a touchdown and recovering six fumbles.

In 2010, Morris signed with the Arizona Rattlers. He had 27 tackles and five interceptions.

Kelvin signed with the Chicago Rush for the 2011 and 2012 seasons.  In 2013, he signed with the Orlando Predators. On March 13, 2013, Kelvin was traded back to the Chicago Rush.

Morris was assigned to the Jacksonville Sharks in 2004, but was placed on reassignment before the season began.

References

External links
Arena Football League bio 
Arizona Rattlers bio 
Clemson Tigers bio 
Spokane Shock bio 

1982 births
Living people
People from Timmonsville, South Carolina
Players of American football from South Carolina
American football linebackers
Southwest Mississippi Bears football players
Clemson Tigers football players
West Georgia Wolves football players
Chicago Bears players
Spokane Shock players
Utah Blaze players
Calgary Stampeders players
Arizona Rattlers players
Chicago Rush players
Orlando Predators players